USS Buckthorn is a name used more than once by the U.S. Navy:

 , a screw steamer, built in 1863 at East Haddam, Connecticut.
 , a net laying ship laid down on 5 December 1940 at Alameda, California.

References 

United States Navy ship names